WIMR-LP (96.5 FM) is a radio station broadcasting a country music format. Licensed to McIntosh, Florida, United States, the station is currently owned by Mcintosh Community Radio Association.

References

External links
 

Country radio stations in the United States
IMR-LP
IMR-LP